The first generation of video game consoles lasted from 1972 to 1983. The first console of this generation was the 1972 Magnavox Odyssey,. The last new console release of the generation was most likely the Compu-Vision 440 by radio manufacturer Bentley in 1983, though other systems were also released in that year.

Repetition and similarities

Naming 

Manufacturers placed emphasis on what the console was and what it could do to differentiate the console. The most common elements were usually:
 TV – Indicating the device utilized television to display its output.
 Color – Indicating the machine was capable of outputting color.
 Game – Indicating a game that could be played.
 Sport(s) – Indicating a sports genre game could be played.
 A number – Usually indicating the quantity of games available on the system.

Identical consoles 
Many consoles were copies of others, had very similar form factors with different inputs, or were distributed under different names in different regions. An example is the Binatone line that was released simultaneously under the names "Mentor" and "Tokyo". Name changes are most commonly exemplified by the Sears Tele-Games line, which consisted of existing Coleco, APF and Atari Consoles. The only difference was the Sears branding.

Market saturation

List 
The following is a list in alphabetical order of the manufacturers, followed by the name of the console, release year, integrated chip if it had one, and whether it came with a light gun or the option to buy one separately. This list is in no way complete, as there are hundreds of consoles, some with color, name, or hardware variations. This list contains 903 consoles.

For comparison, there are  home platforms starting with the second generation, and  handheld consoles, totaling .

Released systems

Canceled Systems

Notes

References 

Lists of video game consoles
Home video game consoles
Home video game consoles